The dividend puzzle is a concept in finance in which companies that pay dividends are rewarded by investors with higher valuations, even though, according to many economists, it should not matter to investors whether a firm pays dividends or not. The reasoning goes that dividends, from the investor’s point of view, should have no effect on the process of valuing equity because the investor already owns the firm and, thus, he/she should be indifferent to either getting the dividends or having them re-invested in the firm. Another reason for economists to be puzzled is that equity holders pay a higher tax rate on dividend payouts compared to capital gains from the firm repurchasing shares as an alternative payout policy. 

The puzzle evolved from the Modigliani–Miller theorems of 1959 and 1961.

The reasons for the dividend puzzle have been attributed to a wide range of factors, including uncertainties, psychological/behavioral economics issues, tax-related matters, and asymmetric information.

References
 Ruben D. Cohen (2002) "The Relationship Between the Equity Risk Premium, Duration and Dividend Yield," Wilmott Magazine, pp 84–97, November issue.

Puzzle
Valuation (finance)
Economic puzzles